Sebastian Eriksson is a Swedish rallycross driver. He is a former participant in the Global Rallycross Championship, and currently competes in the FIA World Rallycross Championship. Throughout his entire professional racing career, he has raced exclusively for Olsbergs MSE.

Eriksson participated in the Light prototype class of the 2022 Dakar Rally in a team with Dutch co-driver Wouter Rosegaar. They finished in second place in their class.

He has no relation with Olsbergs MSE team owner Andréas Eriksson or drivers Kevin Eriksson and Oliver Eriksson.

Racing record

Complete FIA World Rallycross Championship results
(key)

Supercar

RX Lites Cup

Complete Global RallyCross Championship results
(key)

GRC Lites

Supercar

References

Living people
Swedish racing drivers
World Rallycross Championship drivers
Global RallyCross Championship drivers
1993 births